Atsuo (written: 敦夫, 篤夫, 篤緒, 淳夫 or 篤男) is a masculine Japanese given name. Notable people with the name include:

, Japanese astronomer
, Japanese writer and translator
, Japanese ice hockey player
, Japanese ice hockey player
, Japanese literature researcher and poet
, Japanese actor and politician
, Japanese professional wrestler
, Japanese footballer
The drummer of the Japanese avant-garde metal band Boris

Japanese masculine given names